The Utah State League was an Independent baseball minor league baseball league that played in the 1902 season. As the name indicates, the four–team Utah State League consisted of teams based in Utah. The Utah State League played just the 1902 season before permanently folding.

History
The Utah State League began minor league play as an Independent four–team league in 1902. The Utah State League was formed with teams in Lagoon, Utah, Logan, Utah, Ogden, Utah and Salt Lake City, Utah as the charter members.

In the previous season of 1901, the Ogden Lobsters, Railway Ducks/Lagoon Farmers, Park City Miners and Salt Lake City White Wings teams played as members the four–team Class D level Inter-Mountain League, which folded after the 1901 season.

The Utah State League permanently folded as a minor league after the 1902 season. The team records and standings for the 1902 league are unknown, but rosters exist. Numerous Independent and semi–professional teams later played in leagues under the "Utah State League" name in various seasons.

Utah State League teams

1902 standings
The team standings for the 1902 Utah State League are unknown.

References

Defunct minor baseball leagues in the United States
Baseball in Utah
Baseball leagues in Utah
Sports leagues established in 1902
Sports leagues disestablished in 1902
1902 establishments in Utah
1902 disestablishments in Utah